Bernard Douglas Banton AM (13 October 1946 – 27 November 2007) was an Australian social justice campaigner. He was the widely recognized face of the legal and political campaign to achieve compensation for the many sufferers of asbestos-related conditions, which they contracted after either working for the company James Hardie or being exposed to James Hardie Industries' products.

Banton himself suffered from multiple forms of asbestos-related diseases, being diagnosed with asbestosis and also asbestos-related pleural disease (ARPD) in January 1999 after having worked at James Hardie Industries, decades earlier, making asbestos lagging. These conditions required him to carry an oxygen tank wherever he went. On the 17 August 2007, he was also diagnosed with terminal peritoneal mesothelioma asbestos cancer, dying a short 103 days later. The 2009 book Killer Company details Banton's fight against James Hardie.

Banton brought an action against Amaca Pty Ltd before the Dust Diseases Tribunal of New South Wales.

Other campaigning
Banton's final campaign public appearance was In October 2007, during the midst of the 2007 federal election campaign. Banton attempted to personally present Minister for Health Tony Abbott, [later the 28th Prime Minister of Australia] with a petition to include a drug for treating malignant mesothelioma on the Pharmaceutical Benefits Scheme. When Minister Abbott was not in attendance at his Manly (Sydney), NSW electoral office, Banton called him "a gutless creep". Responding, Minister Abbott, who had been in Victoria at the time, was quoted as saying, "Let's be upfront about this. I know Bernie is very sick, but just because a person is sick doesn't necessarily mean that he is pure of heart in all things." He then dismissed the presenting of the petition (at his office) as a "stunt", as he was not aware that Mr Banton had planned to present the petition at his Sydney office until it was too late. Minister Abbott apologised personally to Banton the following morning with Banton offering his own apology in return.

In his victory speech on 24 November after winning the election, the Prime Minister-elect Kevin Rudd paid special tribute to Banton, saying that he represented the "great Australian trade union movement" and was a beacon of decency in his fight for compensation.

Banton died at his home on 27 November, just three days after the election.

Honours
In the Queen's Birthday Honours of 13 June 2005 he was made a Member of the Order of Australia "for service to the community, particularly as an advocate for people affected by asbestos-related illnesses".

Banton's family accepted the NSW government's offer of a state funeral, which was held on 5 December 2007. Both the Australian and the NSW state flags were lowered to half mast that day on all NSW government buildings and establishments, as a mark of respect.

On 21 January 2009, a new asbestos diseases research institute at Sydney's Concord Repatriation General Hospital was named the Bernie Banton Centre. The facility is the world's first standalone research facility dedicated to the treatment and prevention of asbestos-related diseases. The Bernie Banton Bridge, which carries Marsden Street over the Parramatta River in Parramatta also bears his name.

Banton also had a foundation named in his honour. The Bernie Banton Foundation was an Australian not-for-profit organisation devoted to asbestos awareness and education, support and patient advocacy on behalf of asbestos related disease sufferers, their carers and loved ones. The Foundation's aim was to be: ‘The voice of reason for Australian asbestos related disease sufferers, their carers and loved ones, allied health and care providers, and to the wider community.’ The foundation was launched by the Prime Minister, The Hon Kevin Rudd, on 11 September 2009 at Sydney's Concord Repatriation General Hospital.

See also 
 Bernie Banton Foundation
 Devil's Dust

References

External links
 
 
 Homepage of the Bernie Banton website Retrieved 29 June 2013

1946 births
2007 deaths
Deaths from mesothelioma
People from Sydney
Australian trade unionists
Members of the Order of Australia
Deaths from cancer in New South Wales